Jefferson Mall is an enclosed shopping mall in Louisville, Kentucky, the largest city in Kentucky. The mall is located near the intersection of Interstate 65 and Outer Loop in southern Louisville. Jefferson Mall is the only major mall in southern Jefferson County, and the only of Louisville's six regional shopping centers (400,000+ square feet) serving the south and west county; the others are located in the east county.

Jefferson Mall opened in August 1978, named for the county in which it is located. The mall was developed by Richard E. Jacobs Group of Cleveland, Ohio and included  of space. Jefferson Mall's original anchor stores included JCPenney, Sears, and Stewart Dry Goods. Shillito's opened a store in the mall in October 1979.

The mall was sold in 2000 to CBL & Associates Properties of Chattanooga, Tennessee. Louisville's daily newspaper, The Courier-Journal, described the mall as "overlooked" in the Louisville retail scene, not as popular as Oxmoor Center and Mall St. Matthews in eastern Jefferson County. At the time, Jefferson Mall had not been updated substantially since its opening except for the addition of a food court in 1999. The mall's first major renovation was completed in 2003 and included new entrances.

The mall's current anchor stores are Dillard's and JCPenney.

In March 2005 Macy's assumed operation of the former Shillito's, then closed in April 2017 as part of a company-wide downsizing. The former Macy's became Round One Entertainment in December 2018.

On October 15, 2018, it was announced that Sears would be closing in January 2019 as part of a plan to close 142 stores nationwide which left Dillard's and JCPenney as the only traditional anchors left.

References

External links
 

Economy of Louisville, Kentucky
Shopping malls in Kentucky
Shopping malls established in 1978
CBL Properties
Buildings and structures in Louisville, Kentucky
Tourist attractions in Louisville, Kentucky